An exclusion zone is a territorial division established for various, case-specific purposes. 

Per the United States Department of Defense, an exclusion zone is a territory where an authority prohibits specific activities in a specific geographic area (see military exclusion zone). These temporary or permanent zones are created for control of populations for safety, crowd control, or military purposes, or as a border zone.

Nuclear disaster exclusion zones
Large-scale geographic exclusion zones have been established after major disasters in which radioactive particles were released into the environment:
Kyshtym disaster (1957)
East Ural Nature Reserve – Russia, established 1968.
Chernobyl disaster (1986)
Chernobyl Exclusion Zone – Ukraine, established 1986.
Polesie State Radioecological Reserve – Belarus, established 1988.
Fukushima nuclear disaster (2011)
Fukushima Exclusion Zone – Japan, established 2011.

Ordnance exclusion zones
Zone Rouge – France, established 1919

Border zones 
Border zones are areas where movement, property ownership or other activity is prohibited or restricted by legislation. Unlike regular territory, border zones are under administrative control of the border authorities. Entrance is generally only with an individual permit. Entering a border zone without authorization is a crime or misdemeanor and grounds for arrest. Border zones are instituted to pinpoint illegal intruders, conceal and obscure and prevent interference with border security procedures and equipment, and thus aid border guards with their work. For example, Russia maintains sizable border zones.

Natural disaster exclusion zones
Similarly, exclusion zones have been established due to natural disasters. There is an exclusion zone on the island of Montserrat, where the long-dormant Soufrière Hills volcano started erupting in 1995 and has continued erupting since. It encompasses the south part of the island, accounting for over half of its land mass and most areas of the island which were populated before the volcano erupted. The volcano destroyed the island's urban center and capital Plymouth, as well as many other villages and neighborhoods. The zone is now strictly enforced; entry into most of the destroyed areas is prohibited, while some areas are subject to restrictions during volcanic activity or open only as a "daytime entry zone".

Construction 
Exclusion zones are commonly used in the construction industry worldwide. For this purpose they are defined locations to prohibit the entry of personnel into danger areas, established through the risk assessment process for a construction activity. Typically, exclusion zones are set up and maintained around plant and below work at height.

Protesting 
With regard to protesting, an exclusion zone is an area that protesters are legally prohibited from protesting in.

Exclusion zones often exist around seats of government and abortion clinics. As a result of protests by the Westboro Baptist Church at the funerals of soldiers killed in the Iraq War, 29 states and the US Congress created exclusion zones around soldiers' funerals. In 2005, the Parliament of the United Kingdom created a one kilometre exclusion zone around itself.

The First Amendment to the United States Constitution states that "Congress shall make no law... abridging... the right of the people peaceably to assemble, and to petition the Government for a redress of grievances." The existence of exclusion zones is based on court rulings that allow the government to regulate the time, place, and manner of protests.

An exclusion zone is related to a free speech zone. Protesters are required to picket in a free speech zone, thus rendering the area around the free speech zone to be an exclusion zone.

Restraining orders 
When a restraining order is issued, an exclusion zone is an area that the respondent is prohibited from entering—often an area surrounding the petitioner's home or workplace. For example, if a Wisconsin harassment restraining order or domestic abuse restraining order is violated, the court may order GPS monitoring of the respondent. If the exclusion zone is breached, the GPS technology notifies law enforcement and the petitioner.

See also
 Disaster area
 Forbidden Zone (disambiguation)
 Military exclusion zone
 No-go area 
 Protected area
 Sacrifice zone
 Total Exclusion Zone

References

External links

Censorship
Freedom of expression
Political repression